Castlehaven may refer to:

Castlehaven, (Gleann Bhearracháin) is an area near Skibbereen in West Cork, Ireland.
Castlehaven GAA, Castlehaven Gaelic Football Club.
Battle of Castlehaven, Battle of Castlehaven.
Earl of Castlehaven, was a peerage title in the Peerage of Ireland, created on September 6, 1616. It was held in conjunction with the Barony of Audley (created 1312 in the Peerage of England), the Barony of Audley of Orier (created with the earldom in the Peerage of Ireland), and the Barony of Audley of Hely (created for the third Earl in 1633, in the Peerage of England).